Frank Mauer (born April 12, 1988) is a German professional ice hockey player who is currently playing for Eisbären Berlin in the Deutsche Eishockey Liga (DEL).

Playing career
Mauer previously played the entirety of his professional career within the Adler Mannheim organization. On April 27, 2015, after claiming his first DEL Championship title with Mannheim, Mauer left the club as a free agent to sign a one-year contract with fellow German club, EHC München.

Mauer played seven seasons with EHC München before leaving as a free agent to extend his career in the DEL by signing a one-year deal with Eisbären Berlin on 23 June 2022.

Career statistics

Regular season and playoffs

International

References

External links

1988 births
Living people
Sportspeople from Heidelberg
Adler Mannheim players
Eisbären Berlin players
German ice hockey forwards
Heilbronner Falken players
EHC München players
Ice hockey players at the 2018 Winter Olympics
Medalists at the 2018 Winter Olympics
Olympic ice hockey players of Germany
Olympic medalists in ice hockey
Olympic silver medalists for Germany